Western Costume is a costume warehouse in Hollywood, California which supplies costumes and costuming supplies to the film and TV industry. One of the oldest businesses in the industry, the company outdates any studio or production company currently in operation.

History

The company was founded in 1912 by L. L. Burns, a former Indian trader who had amassed a collection of hundreds of American Indian artifacts, weapons, costumes and jewelry items. Burns reached out to silent film cowboy William S. Hart and proposed that Hart allow him to outfit his films. Burns formed a partnership with Harry Revier to service the film industry in 1912, and in 1913 they rented the stables of Hollywood realtor Jacob Stern to establish the Burns & Revier Studio and Laboratory. The barn was subleased to Cecil B. DeMille for the film The Squaw Man. Burns noted the poor quality of the props being used and costumes worn by actors playing American Indians and was hired to provide costumes for the film. Burns's acumen for historically accurate Western wear spread quickly in the film industry, then just in its infancy. Burns expanded his collection with garments from second hand stores and purchased the stock of the only other costume and prop company of the day, Fishers. The Great Depression forced Burns to sell his business and take a job as the head of the costume department at Warner Bros.

Western Costume kept its name through numerous sales both to individuals and a consortium of studios. It augmented its costume sale and rental business with uniform manufacturing for the California National Guard.

The company sells costumes used in well known films at auction from time to time. The company generally only deals with studios and filmmakers but each year, prior to Halloween, the company opens its doors to the general public.  While only a subset of the collection is made available, costumes seen on screen are included. In recent years, dresses from Gone with the Wind, pirate costumes from Treasure Island, as well as costumes from Friday the 13th and Halloween have been available for rental.

Featured filmography 
 Gone with the Wind – all male costumes
 The Jazz Singer – all costumes
 The Birth of a Nation
 The Good, The Bad, and the Ugly
 Bonanza
 Thornbirds
 Roots
 The Right Stuff
 Once Upon A Time In The West

References

External links 
 
 Gallery of costumes from notable films

Film production companies of the United States
Costume design
Companies based in Los Angeles